Boxing at the 2011 Pacific Games in Nouméa, New Caledonia was held on August 30–September 3, 2011. Only men's competition was held, with ten weight divisions contested.

Medal summary

Medal table

Results

See also
 Boxing at the Pacific Games

References

Boxing at the 2011 Pacific Games

2011
2011 Pacific Games
Pacific Games